Environmental terrorism consists of one or more unlawful or even hostile actions that harm or destroy environmental resources or deprive others of their use. It is different to environmental vandalism, which is a rather permitted but ethically disputed destruction of environment. More colloquially, the phrase is also used to label actions seen as the unnecessary or unjustified destruction of the environment for personal or corporate gain.

Definition 
There are academic and semantic difficulties in defining "terrorism" and specifically "environmental terrorism", but discussions of environmental terrorism are growing with a focus on identifying possible risks to natural resources or environmental features. Some,
including in the military 

argue that attacks on natural resources can now cause more deaths, property damage, political chaos, and other adverse effects than in previous years.

Chalecki distinguishes between environmental terrorism and eco-terrorism. She notes that environmental terrorism can be defined "as the unlawful use of force against in situ environmental resources so as to deprive populations of their benefit(s) and/or destroy other property". In contrast, eco-terrorism is the destruction of property in the interest of saving the environment from human encroachment and destruction. More concisely, environmental terrorism involves targeting natural resources. Eco-terrorism involves targeting the built environment such as roads, buildings and trucks, in defense of natural resources. Other analysts may fail to distinguish between these different threats.

Examples 
Incendiary balloons from the Gaza Strip were used to burn down approximately 2,260 acres of woodland in Israel during the first half of 2018.

Children of Fire Initiative, an organization believed to be an offshoot of PKK, claimed responsibility for multiple arson and wildfire attacks in Turkey, including those that happened in 2020.

See also
Environmental impact of war
List of environmental issues
1989 California medfly attack

References

Further reading
Baechler, G. 1999. “Environmental Degradation and Violent Conflict: Hypotheses, Research Agendas, and Theory-building.” In Ecology, politics, and violent conflict, edited by Mohamed Suliman, 76–112. London: Zed Books.
The Gilmore Commission. 2000. “Second Annual Report to the President and the Congress of the Advisory Panel to Assess Domestic Response Capabilities for Terrorism Involving Weapons of Mass Destruction. II. Toward a National Strategy for Combating Terrorism.” Santa Monica, CA: RAND, 15 December 2000.
Gleick, P.H. 1993. "Water and conflict." International Security Vol. 18, No. 1, pp. 79–112 (Summer 1993).
Gleick, P.H. 1998. The World's Water 1998-1999: The Biennial Report on Freshwater Resources. Covelo, CA: Island Press.
Lietzmann, K.M. and G.D. Vest. 1999. Environment & Security in an International Context. Committee on the Challenges of Modern Society - Final Report, March 1999. Report No. 232. North Atlantic Treaty Organization. 174 pp.
Schwartz, D.M. 1998. “Environmental Terrorism: Analyzing the Concept” Journal of Peace Research. Vol. 35, No. 4, July 1998, pp. 483–496.

Environmental crime
Terrorism by method